Beidajie station, is a station of Line 1 and Line 2 of the Xi'an Metro. It started operations on 16 September 2011.
The station is the first interchange station of the Xi'an Metro.

References

Railway stations in Shaanxi
Railway stations in China opened in 2011
Xi'an Metro stations